Oscar Tuazon (née Hansen) is an American artist based in Los Angeles who works in sculpture, architecture, and mixed media.

Early life
Oscar Tuazon was born Oscar Hansen on July 9, 1975, in a geodesic dome his parents built in the woods at Indianola, Kitsap County, Washington. He attended Deep Springs College, Cooper Union, and the Whitney Independent Study Program. In 2001 he served as a founding board member at the Center for Urban Pedagogy in New York with his former Deep Springs classmate Damon Rich.

Oscar met and married Lan Tuazon in New York in the mid-90s and changed his name from Oscar Hansen to Oscar Tuazon. The couple would later be divorced, but he kept the last name. His brother and frequent collaborator, Elias Hansen, is also an artist.

Career
Professionally, he began his career working in the Studio Acconci of architect/artist Vito Acconci. After moving to Paris in 2007, he began exhibiting widely in Europe. He has since then exhibited at the Venice Biennale, the Whitney Biennial, and many group and solo shows throughout the world, and is in major art collections such as Saatchi's.

A critic in the art magazine Frieze wrote in 2013 that "like his heroes, from Gordon Matta-Clark to wilderness survivalists, Tuazon’s non-conformist approach to artistic practice plays at the juncture of architecture, sculpture and performance." A New York Times review described his work as "haunting ... pit[ting] Mr. Acconci's robust ego against Mr. Tuazon's raw and fragile subjectivity."

Personal life
In 2013, he moved from France to the Silver Lake neighborhood of Los Angeles with his three children and wife Dorothée Perret, a former editor at Purple Magazine who now helms the art magazine "Paris, LA."

Exhibitions
 2007
 Where I lived and what I lived for, Palais de Tokyo, Paris
 I'd rather be gone, Standard, Oslo
 Oscar Tuazon / Mike Freeman, castillo/corrales Gallery, Paris
 Voluntary Non vulnerable (with Eli Hansen), Bodgers and Kludgers, Vancouver

 2008
 Kodiak (with Eli Hansen), Seattle Art Museum, Seattle
 Dirty Work, Jonathan Viner, London
 This World’s Just Not Real To Me (with Eli Hansen), Howard House, Seattle

 2009
 Bend It Till It Breaks, Centre international d'art et du paysage de Vassivière (France)
 Against Nature, Künstlerhaus, Stuttgart, Germany- Ass To Mouth, Balice Hertling, Paris
 Another Nameless Venture Gone Wrong, Haugar Vestfold Kunstmuseum, Tønsberg (Norway)

 2010 
 Sex Booze Weed Speed, (with Gardar Eide Einarsson), Rat Hole Gallery, Tokyo
 My Mistake, ICA, Institute of Contemporary Art, London
 My Flesh to Your Bare Bones (with Vito Acconci), Maccarone, New York
 One of My Best Comes, Parc St Léger - Centre d'Art Contemporain, Pougues-les-Eaux (France)

 2011
 Die, The Power Station, Aldon Pinnell, Dallas
 STEEL, PRESSURE-TREATED WOOD, OAK POST, OFFICE CHAIR, INDUCTION STOVETOP, ALUMINUM, Standard, Oslo
 America is my Woman, Maccarone, New York

 2012
 Shaman/Showman (with Karl Holmqvist), Galerie Chantal Crousel, Paris
 Scott Burton, Fondazione Giuliani, Rome
 Manual Labor, Galerie Eva Presenhuber, Zurich
 Action, Jonathan Viner, London

 2013
 Sensory Spaces 1, Musée Boijmans Van Beuningen, Rotterdam
 Spasms of Misuse, Schinkel Pavillon, Berlin
 DÉPENDANCE, dépendance, Brussels

 2014
 I never learn, Standard, Oslo
 Alone in an empty room, Ludwig Museum, Cologne
 A home, Galerie Eva Presenhuber, Zurich
 Oh Brother, Maccarone, New York

Prizes
Nominated for the Prix Fondation d'entreprise Ricard in 2009.

References

1975 births
Living people
American installation artists
American conceptual artists
21st-century American sculptors
21st-century male artists
American male sculptors
Cooper Union alumni
Deep Springs College alumni